The 2014 Florida State Seminoles football team, variously Florida State or FSU, represented Florida State University in the sport of American football during the 2014 NCAA Division I FBS college football season. Florida State competed in the Football Bowl Subdivision (FBS) of the National Collegiate Athletic Association (NCAA). The Seminoles were led by fifth-year head coach Jimbo Fisher and played their home games at Bobby Bowden Field at Doak Campbell Stadium in Tallahassee, Florida. They were members of the Atlantic Coast Conference, playing in the Atlantic Division. It was the Seminoles' 23rd season as a member of the ACC and its 10th in the ACC Atlantic Division.

Florida State entered the season as the defending national champion.

The Seminoles ended the regular season as the only team from a power conference without a loss, but finished the season with a 13–1 record. The Seminoles won the ACC Atlantic Division for the sixth time, advancing to their fifth conference championship game, where they defeated Georgia Tech to win their fifteenth conference title. Florida State was selected to play in the inaugural College Football Playoff, losing to Oregon in the semifinal at the Rose Bowl and snapping the Seminoles' 29-game win streak. Starting quarterback and 2013 Heisman Trophy winner Jameis Winston was the first pick in the NFL Draft.

Before the season

Previous season

Florida State ended the 2013 season with a 14–0 record (8–0 in ACC play), winning the conference championship and the national title while quarterback Jameis Winston won the Heisman Trophy. They were led by Jimbo Fisher in his fourth year as head coach. Seven players from the 2013 team were taken in the 2014 NFL Draft.

Returning

Offense
 Jameis Winston
 Rashad Greene
 Nick O'Leary
 Cameron Erving
 Josue Matías
 Tre' Jackson
 Bobby Hart
 Kermit Whitfield

Defense
 Eddie Goldman
 Nile-Lawrence Stample
 Mario Edwards
 Terrance Smith
 Ronald Darby
 P. J. Williams
 Jalen Ramsey
 Nick Waisome
 Demarcus Walker

Special teams
 Roberto Aguayo
 Cason Beatty

Departures

Offense
 Chad Abram
 Kenny Shaw
 Bryan Stork
 Kelvin Benjamin
 Devonta Freeman
 James Wilder, Jr.

Defense
 Jacobbi McDaniel
 Christian Jones
 Telvin Smith
 Terrence Brooks
 Lamarcus Joyner
 Timmy Jernigan
 Demonte McAllister

Transfers

Offense
 Jacob Coker

Recruiting class

Coaching changes
Prior to the start of the season, defensive coordinator Jeremy Pruitt left his position at Florida State to take the same job at the University of Georgia. Linebackers coach Charles Kelly was promoted to defensive coordinator while wide receivers coach Lawrence Dawsey and quarterbacks coach Randy Sanders were promoted as offensive coordinators. To round out the coaching staff, Bill Miller was hired to coach linebackers.

Spring game
The annual 'Garnet & Gold Game' was held on April 12 at Doak S. Campbell Stadium. The Garnet team, led by quarterback Jameis Winston, was victorious with a 31–14 win over the Gold team.

Personnel

Coaching staff

Roster

Depth chart

Media
Florida State football is broadcast on the Florida State University Seminoles Radio Network and the games are called by Gene Deckerhoff.

Statistics

Scores by quarter (all opponents)

Scores by quarter (ACC opponents)

Rankings

Season
In the ACC Media Poll, Florida State was voted to finish first in the Atlantic Division and win the ACC title. Jameis Winston was selected as the Preseason Player of the Year. FSU led the league with nine preseason All-ACC selections in Rashad Greene, Nick O'Leary, Cameron Erving, Tre' Jackson, Jameis Winston, Karlos Williams on offense along with Mario Edwards and P. J. Williams on defense and Roberto Aguayo on special teams.

Schedule

Game summaries

Oklahoma State

The Citadel

Clemson

NC State

Wake Forest

Syracuse

Notre Dame

Louisville

Virginia

Miami (FL)

Boston College

Florida

ACC Championship: Georgia Tech

Rose Bowl: Oregon

Awards
John Mackey Award
Nick O'Leary

 Career Achievement Award
Rashad Greene

 Vlade Janakievski Award
Roberto Aguayo

All-Americans
Nick O'Leary, Tre' Jackson and Roberto Aguayo were chosen as consensus All-American players.
Nick O'Leary
Cameron Erving
Tre' Jackson
Roberto Aguayo
Josue Matias
Ronald Darby
Jalen Ramsey
P. J. Williams
Rashad Greene
Eddie Goldman
Mario Edwards, Jr.
Jameis Winston
Roderick Johnson
Dalvin Cook

Conference
Jacobs Blocking Trophy
Cameron Erving

All-ACC
ACSMA
Offense
First Team
Rashad Greene
Nick O'Leary
Cameron Erving
Tre' Jackson
Jameis Winston
Roberto Aguayo
Second Team 
Josue Matias
Dalvin Cook
Third Team
Bobby Hart
Defense
First Team
Mario Edwards Jr.
Eddie Goldman
P. J. Williams
Jalen Ramsey
Second Team
Terrance Smith
Third Team
Reggie Northrup
Ronald Darby

Coaches
Offense
First Team
Rashad Greene
Nick O"Leary
Tre' Jackson
Jameis Winston
Roberto Aguayo
Third Team
Bobby Hart
Josue Matias
Cameron Erving
Dalvin Cook
Honorable Mention
Karlos Williams
Defense
First Team
Mario Edwards, Jr.
Eddie Goldman
Jalen Ramsey
Second Team
Terrance Smith
P. J. Williams
Third Team
Reggie Northrup
Ronald Darby

Honors
Week One
ACC Players of the Week
Wide receiver
Rashad Greene 
Defensive lineman
Mario Edwards, Jr.
Lou Groza Star of the Week
Roberto Aguayo
College Football Performance Awards
Specialist of the Week: Roberto Aguayo (Honorable Mention)
Receiver of the Week: Rashad Greene (Honorable Mention)
Defensive Back of the Week: Nate Andrews (Honorable Mention)

Week Four
ACC Players of the Week
Wide receiver
Rashad Greene
Defensive lineman
Eddie Goldman

Week Five
ACC Players of the Week
Wide receiver
Rashad Greene 
Offensive lineman
Tre' Jackson

Week Six
ACC Players of the Week
Linebacker
Reggie Northrup
Specialist
Roberto Aguayo
Lou Groza Star of the Week
Roberto Aguayo
College Football Performance Awards
Specialist of the Week: Roberto Aguayo
Linebacker of the Week: Reggie Northrup

Week Seven
ACC Players of the Week
Offensive lineman
Tre' Jackson
John Mackey National Tight End of the Week
Nick O'Leary

Week Eight
ACC Players of the Week
Offensive lineman
Tre' Jackson
Linebacker
Terrance Smith
Bednarik National Defensive Player of the Week
Terrance Smith

Week Ten
ACC Players of the Week
Offensive back
Jameis Winston
Offensive lineman
Cameron Erving
Linebacker
Reggie Northrup
Rookie
Dalvin Cook
Athlon Sports Freshman of the Week
Dalvin Cook

Week Eleven
ACC Players of the Week
Wide receiver
Rashad Greene
Defensive lineman
Mario Edwards, Jr.
Lou Groza Star of the Week
Roberto Aguayo

Week Twelve
ACC Players of the Week
Offensive lineman
Cameron Erving
Defensive back
Jalen Ramsey
Specialist
Roberto Aguayo
Rookie
Dalvin Cook
Athlon Sports Defensive Player of the Week
Jalen Ramsey
Bednarik National Defensive Player of the Week
Jalen Ramsey

Week Thirteen
ACC Players of the Week
Specialist
Roberto Aguayo

Week Fourteen
ACC Players of the Week
Linebacker
Terrance Smith

Watchlists
Lott Trophy
Ronald Darby
Rimington Trophy
Austin Barron
Paul Hornung Award
Levonte Whitfield
Maxwell Award
Rashad Greene
Karlos Williams
Jameis Winston
Bednarik Award
Mario Edwards Jr.
P. J. Williams
 John Mackey Award
Nick O'Leary
Lou Groza Award
Roberto Aguayo
Nagurski Trophy
Mario Edwards Jr.
P. J. Williams
Outland Trophy
Cameron Erving
Tre' Jackson
Josue Matías
Jim Thorpe Award
Jalen Ramsey
P. J. Williams
Lombardi Award
Mario Edwards Jr.
Cameron Erving
Tre' Jackson
Josue Matías
Butkus Award
Terrance Smith
Biletnikoff Award
Rashad Greene
Davey O'Brien Award
Jameis Winston
Walter Camp Award
Cameron Erving
Jameis Winston
Manning Award
Jameis Winston

Quarterfinalists
 John Mackey Award
Nick O'Leary
 Lott Trophy
Ronald Darby

Semifinalists
 Jim Thorpe Award
P. J. Williams
 Maxwell Award
Jameis Winston
 Davey O'Brien Award
Jameis Winston
 Lou Groza Award
Roberto Aguayo
 Biletnikoff Award
Rashad Greene
 John Mackey Award
Nick O'Leary
 Walter Camp Award
Jameis Winston 
 Outland Trophy
Tre' Jackson
 Maxwell Coach of the Year Award
Jimbo Fisher

Finalists
 Lou Groza Award
Roberto Aguayo
 John Mackey Award
Nick O'Leary
 Manning Award
Jameis Winston
Eddie Robinson Coach of the Year
Jimbo Fisher
 Dodd Trophy
Jimbo Fisher
Bear Bryant Award
Jimbo Fisher

All-star games

NFL draft
The following FSU players were selected in the 2015 NFL Draft:

Offensive lineman Josue Matias went on to sign with the Tennessee Titans as an undrafted free agent while wide receiver Jarred Haggins signed with the Detroit Lions.

References

Bibliography
2014 Florida State Seminoles Football Media Guide

External links
 Season statistics

Florida State
Florida State Seminoles football seasons
Atlantic Coast Conference football champion seasons
Florida State Seminoles football